Park Min-seo (born 30 June 1998) is a South Korean footballer currently playing as a forward for Chungnam Asan FC.

Career statistics

Club

Notes

References

1998 births
Living people
South Korean footballers
Association football forwards
K League 2 players
Asan Mugunghwa FC players